Alucita grammodactyla is a moth of the family Alucitidae. It is found in most of Europe, except Ireland, Great Britain, Portugal, Norway, Finland, Latvia, Lithuania, Ukraine, Slovenia and Greece. It is also present in Turkey. The habitat consists of moist rich fens, eu- and mesotrophic meadows, colline and montane hay meadows, acid grasslands and heaths at altitudes ranging from 90 to 900 meters.

The wingspan 14–17 mm for males and females. Adults are on wing from April to September. Adults are on wing from July to early September and again (after hibernation) until early June.

The larvae feed on Scabiosa columbaria and Scabiosa canescens. The ground colour of the larvae is washed yellow with a yellowish brown head.

References

External links

Images representing  Alucita grammodactyla at Consortium for the Barcode of Life

Moths described in 1841
Alucitidae
Moths of Europe
Moths of Asia
Taxa named by Philipp Christoph Zeller